Pavel Kanarsky (born February 25, 1982) is a Russian professional ice hockey player. He currently plays for Metallurg Novokuznetsk in the Kontinental Hockey League (KHL).

Kanarsky made his Kontinental Hockey League debut playing with Severstal Cherepovets during the inaugural 2008–09 KHL season.

References

External links

1982 births
Living people
Metallurg Novokuznetsk players
Ice hockey people from Moscow
Russian ice hockey defencemen
Saryarka Karagandy players